is one of the preserved throwing techniques, or Habukareta Waza, of Judo. the 1895 Gokyo no Waza lists. A related technique with the same name is also on the Shinyo no Maki list of Danzan Ryu Jujutsu. It is categorized as a hand technique, Te-waza.

Included Systems 
Systems:
Kodokan Judo, List of Kodokan Judo techniques
Lists:
The Canon Of Judo
Judo technique

Similar Techniques, Variants, and Aliases 
 Belt Drop

References

External links
 ObiOtoshi Instruction Animated
 Judoschool.org Collection of Obi Otoshi Videos
Alabama Judo Federation video

Judo technique
Throw (grappling)